The 17th Niue Assembly was a term of the Niue Assembly. Its composition was determined by the 2020 election, held on 30 May 2020.

Members 
The members of the 17th Legislative Assembly are:

Common roll 

 Richard Hipa
 Sauni Tongatule
 Crossley Tatui
 Stan Kalauni
 O'Love Jacobsen
 Terry Coe

Constituency 

 Va'aiga Tukuitonga
 Dalton Tagelagi
 Poimamao Vakanofiti
 Richie Mautama
 Opili Talafas
 John Operator Tiakia
 Tofua Puletama
 Makaseau Ioane
 Jack Lipitoa
 Ricky Makani
 Dion Taufitu
 Mona Ainuu
 Talaititama Talaiti

References 

Niue
Politics of Niue
Political organisations based in Niue
Sittings of the Niue Assembly
Niue Assembly